Rich Benjamin is an American cultural critic, anthropologist, and author.  Benjamin is perhaps best known for the non-fiction book Searching for Whitopia: An Improbable Journey to the Heart of White America.
He is also a lecturer and a public intellectual, who has discussed issues on NPR, PBS, CNN and MSNBC. His writing appears in The New York Times, The New Yorker, The Guardian and the Los Angeles Times/

Career 
Benjamin's work focuses on US politics and culture, comparative world politics, money, class, Blacks, Whites, Latinos, public policy, global cultural transformation, and demographic change.

Benjamin has been contributing essays to The New Yorker since 2017.

Benjamin speaks across the country on technology and digital media.  He has presented talks at Techonomy and at conferences on Web 3.0, decentralization, crypto, and blockchain.

Benjamin is one of the leading experts on whiteness in America—including how demographic change affects social attitudes; how white migration patterns shape economic and political trends; and how perceptions/experiences of whiteness impact a person's and community's political behavior, as well as the democracy.  Benjamin's work exposes how a white conservative minority is working to dismantle democracy — voter suppression; threatening Electors; gerrymandering; undercutting information and expertise; and normalizing domestic terror and violence.
 
Benjamin's investigation of Whitopia was the subject of a TED Talk that has been viewed more than 2.8 million times.  His book was one of the first to have predicted well in advance the social and-political forces creating the rise of "Trumpism" The book has received wide coverage on NPR, MSNBC, CNN, and Fox News.

In 2020 Benjamin was appointed to the advisory board of New_Public, a community of thinkers, designers and technologists planning and building more democratic and usable digital public spaces for the future.

In 2021 Benjamin delivered the Poynter Lecture at Yale Law School on "conservatism and Trumpism in the era of digital media—on how right-wing ideology, white fear, and the digital media ecosystem threaten democracy in America."

In 2021, he served as a Fellow at the Cullman Center for Scholars and Writers at the New York Public Library.

Education 

As a doctoral student at Stanford University, Benjamin studied with Professors Tim Lenoir and Terry Winograd, an adviser to the founders of Google.

References

External links

Living people
American male journalists
American columnists
African-American writers
American political writers
American gay writers
White culture scholars
Year of birth missing (living people)
21st-century African-American people